Ombrophytum is a genus of flowering plants belonging to the family Balanophoraceae.

Its native range is Southern Tropical America.

Species
Species:

Ombrophytum chilensis 
Ombrophytum guayanense 
Ombrophytum microlepis 
Ombrophytum peruvianum 
Ombrophytum subterraneum 
Ombrophytum villamariensis 
Ombrophytum violaceum

References

Balanophoraceae
Santalales genera